Wannebach is a river of North Rhine-Westphalia, Germany.

It is a right tributary of the Lenne near Hagen.

See also
List of rivers of North Rhine-Westphalia

References

Rivers of North Rhine-Westphalia
Rivers of Germany